Volodymyr Kyrylovych Vynnychenko (– March 6, 1951) was a Ukrainian statesman, political activist, writer, playwright, artist, who served as the first Prime Minister of Ukraine.

As a writer, Vynnychenko is recognized in Ukrainian literature as a leading modernist writer in prerevolutionary Ukraine, who wrote short stories, novels, and plays, but in Soviet Ukraine his works were forbidden, like that of many other Ukrainian writers, from the 1930s until the mid-1980s. Prior to his entry onto the stage of Ukrainian politics, he was a long-time political activist, who lived abroad in Western Europe from 1906 to 1914. His works reflect his immersion in the Ukrainian revolutionary milieu, among impoverished and working-class people, and among émigrés from the Russian Empire living in Western Europe.

Early life
Vynnychenko was born in a village, Vesely Kut (today – Hryhorivka, Novoukrainka Raion), in the Kherson Governorate of the Russian Empire, in a family of peasants. His father Kyrylo Vasyliovych Vynnychenko earlier in his life was a peasant-serf who moved from a village to the city of Yelisavetgrad, where he married a widow, Yevdokia Pavlenko (nee: Linnyk). From her previous marriage Yevdokia had three children: Andriy, Maria, and Vasyl, while from the marriage with Kyrylo only one son, Volodymyr. Upon graduating from a local public school the Vynnychenko family managed to enroll Volodymyr at the Yelyzavetgrad Male Gymnasium (today the building of the State Emergency Service of Ukraine). In later grades of the gymnasium he took part in a revolutionary organization and wrote a revolutionary poem for which he was incarcerated for a week and excluded from school. That did not stop him from continuing his studies as he was getting prepared for his test to obtain the high school diploma (Matura). He successfully took the test in the Zlatopil gymnasium from which obtained his attestation of maturity.

In 1900 Vynnychenko joined the Revolutionary Ukrainian Party (RUP) and enrolled in the law department at Kiev University, but in 1902 or 1903 he was expelled for participation in revolutionary activities. As a member of the RUP he provided political agitation and propaganda among the Kievan workers and peasants from Poltava and was jailed for several months in Lukyanivska Prison. He managed to escape from his incarceration. In 1902 Vynnychenko published in "Kievskaya starina" his first novel "Beauty and strength", after which he became known as a writer. Afterward, due to a new arrest he was forcibly drafted into a punitive battalion in the Russian Imperial army where he began to agitate soldiers with revolutionary propaganda. Tipped off that his arrest was imminent, Vynnychenko illegally fled to eastern Galicia, Austria-Hungary. When trying to return to Russian Ukraine with revolutionary literature, Vynnychenko was arrested and jailed in Kiev for two years with a threat to spend the rest of his life in katorga. After his release in 1905, he passed his exams for a law degree in Kiev University.

In 1906 Vynnychenko was arrested for a third time, again for his political activities, and jailed for a year; before his scheduled trial, however, the wealthy patron of Ukrainian literature and culture, Yevhen Chykalenko, paid his bail, and Vynnychenko fled Ukraine again, effectively becoming an émigré writer abroad from 1907 to 1914, living in Lemberg (Lviv), Vienna, Geneva, Paris, Florence, Berlin. In 1911 Vynnychenko married Rosalia Lifshitz, a French Jewish doctor. From 1914 to 1917 Vynnychenko lived illegally near Moscow throughout much of World War I and returned to Kiev in 1917 to assume a leading role in Ukrainian politics.

Ideas about the Ukrainian nation
Vynnychenko’s political awakening arose, he claimed, at the intersection of social and national experience. Writing in his diary in 1919, he recalled that “from the time the landowner Bodisko beat my father on his estate, fooled him, exploited him, chased him from his plot into the field, where I was tending livestock, from that moment I already took into my soul the seed of hatred for social exploitation, for Bodiskos of all types.”  Other youthful experiences added feelings of national humiliation and anger to these social emotions. He recalled, for example, how, as a gymnasium student, teachers and other students (“young gentlemen”) treated him as a “little muzhik” [peasant] and a “little khokhol” [a derisive term for Ukrainian].
Vynnychenko demanded respect and recognition for Ukraine and Ukrainians as a nation. In 1913, he published in Russian an “Open Letter to Russian Writers” that criticized the “unconscious” tendency in a great deal of Russian literature to stereotype Ukrainians and others. The Ukrainian characters who appear in Russian literature, he argued, are much like the stereotypes of Jews and Armenians that Russians also have “a weakness for.” “Always and everywhere [in Russian literature] the ‘khokhol’ is a little stupid, a little cunning, a little lazy, melancholic and sometimes good-natured.” These stereotypes are “shameful” not only for Ukrainians whose equal humanity is not recognized but for Russian writers themselves and Russian literature.

During the First World War, which brought fighting and occupation onto Ukrainian lands, Vynnychenko rhetorically wondered why our “brother” Russians show little concern with the suffering of Ukrainians? Why does “the love among Ukrainians for their own nation [narod] and sorrow for its fate elicit…wrath, indignation, and feelings of spite, or, at best, sarcasm or indifference?” The answer, he argued (writing in Russian, so again addressing Russians as much as Ukrainians), is that Ukrainians are becoming strong and aware as a nation, and “they fear us.” But nothing can stop the development of Ukrainian “consciousness,” he declared, which is already manifest in its intelligentsia. “Just as you cannot stop the formation of clouds, arising from the earth and returning to it, so it is impossible to stop the formation of a nationally conscious stratum in a people. We emerge from the raw earth, from the soil, from the depths of our nation, and we again return to it, and we again arise.”

Vynnychenko believed that it was not enough to change structures of power in freeing the Ukrainian nation. Liberation demanded changes in people’s mentalities and values, in their moral and spiritual lives, in their selves. A true revolution needed to be, Vynnychenko insisted, all-sided, all-embracing, universal liberation (vsebichne vyzvolennia). To explore and promote this vision, he examined in his fiction questions of sexuality, emotion, will, and character. Ultimately, the point was to ask the most important question: how to realize a fully human and fully free personality, especially in the face of the crushing conditions and legacies of unfreedom?

Head of first Ukrainian government

After the February Revolution in Russia in 1917, Vynnychenko served as the head of the General Secretariat, a representative executive body of the Russian Provisional Government in Ukraine. He was authorized by the Central Rada of Ukraine (a de facto parliament) to conduct negotiations with the Russian Provisional Government, 1917.

Vynnychenko resigned his post in the General Secretariat on August 13 in protest against the Russian government's rejection of the Universal of Central Rada. For a brief period he was replaced by Dmytro Doroshenko who composed a new government the next day, yet unexpectedly he requested his resignation as well on August 18. Vynnychenko was offered to return, form a cabinet and redesign the Second Universal to petition a federal union with the Russian Republic. His second government was confirmed by Alexander Kerensky on September 1.

It is often claimed that the political mistakes of Vynnychenko and Mykhailo Hrushevsky cost the newly established Ukrainian People's Republic its independence. Both men were strongly opposed to the creation of the army of the Republic and repeatedly denied the requests by Symon Petliura to use his volunteer forces as the core of a would-be army (see Polubotok Regiment Affair).

After the October Revolution and the Kiev Bolshevik uprising many of his secretaries resigned after the Central Rada disapproved the Bolsheviks' actions in Petrograd with the ongoing confrontations in Moscow as well as the other cities in the country. On January 22, 1918, the Ukrainian People's Republic proclaimed its independence because of the Bolshevik intervention headed by Antonov-Ovseyenko. The country was squeezed between the abandoned German-Russian frontlines to its western border and the advancing Bolshevik forces of Muravyov along the eastern border. Within days, Mikhail Muravyov managed to invade Kiev, forcing the government to evacuate to Zhytomyr whose retreat was secured by the efforts of the Yevhen Konovalets Sich Riflemen. During the evacuation, the Ukrainian government managed to secure military assistance in the face of the Central Powers. The government signed the highly-criticised treaty with the Germans to repel the Bolshevik forces in exchange for a right to expropriate food supplies. That treaty also required the Soviet Russia to recognise the Ukrainian People's Republic. Around then, Vynnychenko's government established an economic agreement with the government of the Belarus People's Republic through the Belarus Chamber of Commerce in Kiev. However, Vynnychenko's was replaced as well by the Socialist-Revolutionary government of Vsevolod Holubovych.

After the coup d'état of Hetman Pavlo Skoropadsky in collaboration with the German occupation forces in April 1918, Vynnychenko left Kiev. Later, after forming the Directorate of Ukraine, he took an active part in organizing a revolt against the Hetman. The revolt was successful and Vynnychenko returned to the capital on December 19, 1918. The Directorate, a temporary executive council of five, proclaimed the restoration of the Ukrainian People's Republic. The Directorate was put in charge by the Labour Congress until the Ukrainian Constituent Assembly would convene to elect a permanent body of government.

Resignation
Vynnychenko, unable to restore order or to overcome his disagreement with Petliura, stepped down on February 10, 1919 and emigrated abroad. In a brief period in Vienna in 1920, he wrote his three-volume "Rebirth of the Nation". At the same time, at the end of 1919, Vynnychenko resigned from the Ukrainian Social Democratic Labour Party and formed the Foreign Group of Ukrainian Communists.

Soviet Ukraine
He formed the Foreign Group of the Ukrainian Communist Party, which was mainly made up of other former members of the Ukrainian Social-Democratic Party, to promulgate this position. In June 1920 Vynnychenko himself travelled to Moscow in an attempt to come to an agreement with the Bolsheviks. After four months of unsuccessful negotiations, Vynnychenko had become disillusioned with the Bolsheviks: he accused them of Great Russian Chauvinism and insincerity as socialists. In September 1920 he returned to émigré life, where he revealed his impressions of Bolshevik rule. This action produced a split in the Foreign Group of the Ukrainian Communist Party: some remained pro-Bolshevik and indeed returned to Soviet Ukraine; others supported Vynnychenko, and with him conducted a campaign against the Soviet regime in their organ Nova Doba ("New Era").

Exile
Vynnychenko spent 30 years in Europe, residing in Germany in the 1920s and then moving to France. As an émigré, Vynnychenko resumed his career as a writer. In 1919, his works were republished in an eleven-volume edition in the 1920s. In 1934, Vynnychenko moved from Paris to Mougins, near Cannes, on the Mediterranean coast, where he lived on a homestead type residence as a self-supporting farmer and continued to write, notably a philosophical exposition of his ideas about happiness, Concordism. Vynnychenko called his place Zakoutok. He died in Mougins, near Cannes, France in 1951. Rosalia Lifshitz after her death passed the estate to Ivanna Vynnykiv-Nyzhnyk (1912–1993), who emigrated to France after World War II and lived with Vynnychenko since 1948.

Legacy
Vynnychenko is still somewhat famous in Ukraine. Vynnychenko has not been as popular as Mykhailo Hrushevsky as a political figure, but is widely known as writer; his work was adapted for screen numerous times since the 1990s by Dovzhenko Film Studios directors.

Vynnychenko's archives are housed in Columbia University, New York City and supervised by a commission of the Ukrainian Academy of Arts and Sciences.

Films based on works of Vynnychenko
 1921 The Black Panther
 1990 Black panther and White bear (Oleh Biyma, Ukrtelefilm)
 1991 Sin (Oleh Biyma, Ukrtelefilm)
 1995 TV-series Island of Love: Episode 8 "Engagement" (Oleh Biyma, Ukrtelefilm) after the novel "Engagement"

Depiction of Vynnychenko in cinema
 1939 Shchors (Oleksandr Dovzhenko and Yuliya Solntseva, Kiev Film Studios) by Dmytro Milyutenko
 1957 Truth (Viktor Dobrovolsky and Isaak Shmaruk, Dovzhenko Film Studios) by Heorhiy Babenko
 1970 Peace to huts – War to palaces (Isaak Shmaruk, Dovzhenko Film Studios) by Vladislav Strzhelchik
 1970 Kotsyubynsky family (Tymofiy Levchuk, Dovzhenko Film Studios) by Harijs Liepiņš
 2018 Secret diary of Symon Petliura (Oles Yanchuk, Dovzhenko Film Studios) by Yevhen Nyshchuck

Bibliography
 Vynnychenko, V. Selected short stories. Longwood Academic, 1991.  (Book at Google)
 Vynnychenko, V. Rebirth of the Nation. (History of Ukrainian Revolution. March 1917 – December 1919). Vol 1–3. Kiev-Vienna: "Dzvin", 1920.
 Vynnychenko, Volodymyr. Black Panther and Polar Bear. Translated into English by Yuri Tkacz. Melbourne: Bayda Books, 2020.

References

Sources
 Bahrii-Pykulyk, R. Rozum ta irrattsiional'nist' u Vynnychenkomu romani. (Reason and irrationality in Vynnychenko's novel). New York: "Suchasnist'", 27, no.4 (1987): 11–22.
 Czajkowskyj, M. Volodymyr Vynnychenko and his Mission to Moscow and Kharkiv. "Journal of Graduate Ukrainian Studies", 1978, Vol. 3, No.2, pp. 3–24.
 Gilley, C. The Change of Signposts in the Ukrainian Emigration: A Contribution to the History of Sovietophilism in the 1920s. Stuttgart: "Ibidem", 2009. Chapter 3.
 Gilley, C. Volodymyr Vynnychenko’s Mission to Moscow and Kharkov. "The Slavonic and East European Review". Vol.84, 2006, No.3, pp. 508–37.
 Kostiuk, H. Volodymyr Vynnychenko ta ioho doba. (Volodymyr Vynnychenko and his era). New York: "UAAS", 1980.
 Panchenko, V. Budynok z khymeramy: Tvorchist' Volodymyra Vynnychenka 1900–1920 r.r. u evropeys'komu literaturnomu konteksti. (A building made of chimeras: the creative work of Volodymyr Vynnychenko 1900–1920 in the European literary context). Kirovohrad: "Narodne Slovo", 1998.
 Steinberg, M. D. "Overcoming Empire: Volodymyr Vynnychenko," in The Russian Revolution, 1905-21, Oxford University Press, 2017: 244-60. 
 Struk, D.H. Vynnychenko's Moral Laboratory. "In Studies in Ukrainian Literature 1984–1985".

External links

 
 Lashchyk, E. Vynnychenko's Philosophy of Happiness. "The Annals of the Ukrainian Academy of Arts and Sciences". Vol. 16, No. 41-42 (1984–85): 289–326.
 

1880 births
1951 deaths
People from Kirovohrad Oblast
People from Yelisavetgradsky Uyezd
Ukrainian people in the Russian Empire
Ukrainian Social Democratic Labour Party politicians
Heads of state of Ukraine
Prime ministers of the Ukrainian People's Republic
Interior ministers of Ukraine
Members of the Central Council of Ukraine
Ukrainian diplomats
Society of Ukrainian Progressors members
Ukrainian democracy activists
Ukrainian writers
Ukrainian science fiction writers
Ukrainian screenwriters
Ukrainian male writers
Ukrainian independence activists
Ukrainian revolutionaries
People of the Russian Revolution
Russian Constituent Assembly members
Taras Shevchenko National University of Kyiv people
Inmates of Lukyanivska Prison
People who emigrated to escape Bolshevism
Ukrainian emigrants to France
Emigrants from the Russian Empire to Germany
Emigrants from the Russian Empire to France
20th-century screenwriters